The 2017 Supercars Championship (formally known as the 2017 Virgin Australia Supercars Championship) was an FIA-sanctioned international motor racing series for Supercars, which prior to July 2016 had been known as V8 Supercars. It was the nineteenth running of the Supercars Championship and the twenty-first series in which Supercars have contested the premier Australian touring car title. 

The 2017 season saw the category undergo a substantial revision of its technical regulations, with the introduction of Gen 2 Supercar rules which opened the championship up to a wider range of body shapes and engine configurations. Despite this, all teams continued within the previous regulations.

DJR Team Penske was awarded the Teams Championship and Ford won the Manufacturers Championship. Jamie Whincup claimed his seventh title in controversial circumstances when Scott McLaughlin was penalized in the title-deciding race.

Teams and drivers
Holden and Nissan were represented by factory-backed teams.

The following drivers contested the 2017 series.

Team changes

 Jason Bright moved his Britek Motorsport Racing Entitlement Contract (REC) from Brad Jones Racing to Prodrive Racing Australia.
 Super Black Racing closed at the end of 2016, with its REC sold to Prodrive Racing Australia co-owner, Rusty French, who on-sold it to Tim Blanchard Racing.
 Triple Eight Race Engineering became the official Holden factory team. Walkinshaw Racing, which competed as the factory Holden Racing Team from 1990 to 2016, became a customer Holden team instead.
Volvo withdrew from the series at the end of the 2016 season. Garry Rogers Motorsport returned to using Holden Commodores, as it had done prior to switching to Volvo in 2014.

Driver changes
 Jason Bright moved from Brad Jones Racing returning to Prodrive Racing Australia, for whom he drove in 2005 and 2006, racing under his Britek Motorsport REC. 
 Matt Chahda was scheduled to make his Supercars début with Lucas Dumbrell Motorsport, but his application for a racing licence was refused by the Confederation of Australian Motor Sport. Taz Douglas instead drove for Lucas Dumbrell Motorsport for the first three events of the season.
 Shae Davies left Erebus Motorsport to return to the Dunlop Super2 Series.
 Simona de Silvestro joined the championship with Nissan Motorsport. Having contested the 2015 and 2016 Bathurst 1000 events, de Silvestro is the first female driver to contest the full championship since Melinda Price and Kerryn Brewer in 1998.
 Scott McLaughlin moved from Garry Rogers Motorsport to DJR Team Penske.
 Nick Percat moved from Lucas Dumbrell Motorsport to Brad Jones Racing.
 Chris Pither lost his seat at Super Black Racing after the team closed, he returned as an endurance race co-driver with Erebus Motorsport.
 Scott Pye moved from DJR Team Penske to Walkinshaw Racing.
 Alex Rullo became the youngest Supercars driver in the series' history when he made his début for Lucas Dumbrell Motorsport at the Adelaide 500.
 Garth Tander moved from Walkinshaw Racing to Garry Rogers Motorsport, having previously driven for the team between 1998 and 2004.
 Dale Wood moved from Nissan Motorsport to Erebus Motorsport.

Mid-season changes
 Taz Douglas was unable to contest the fourth event of the championship, at Barbagallo Raceway. He was replaced by former IndyCar Series and United States Auto Club driver Matthew Brabham. He returned for the Enduro Cup and the Newcastle 500
 Cameron McConville returned to Lucas Dumbrell Motorsport for the Darwin Triple Crown.
 Aaren Russell returned to Lucas Dumbrell Motorsport for the Townsville, Pukekohe and Newcastle rounds of the series. As well as the Enduro Cup
 Alex Davison drove for Lucas Dumbrell Motorsport at the Ipswich and Sydney Motorsport Park events, as well as in the Enduro Cup.
 Ash Walsh was scheduled to drive with Tim Slade in all three endurance races however after sustaining injuries while testing another car, was forced to withdraw from the Bathurst 1000 and was replaced by Andre Heimgartner. Heimgartner also drove for the team at the Gold Coast 600.
 Alex Rullo's contract was terminated by Lucas Dumbrell Motorsport after the Gold Coast 600. He was replaced by Super2 Series driver Jack Perkins.

Calendar
The following fourteen events are scheduled to take place in 2017:

Calendar changes
 The Sydney 500—which was held at the Homebush Street Circuit from 2009 to 2016—was replaced by a new event, the Newcastle 500. The event was held on a street circuit in the East End of Newcastle, and was run to the SuperStreet format, featuring two races of 250 kilometres.

Format changes
 The Adelaide 500 returned to its original format of two races of 250 kilometres, which was last used in 2013. Event organisers cited the unpopularity of the format used between 2014 and 2016—two races of 125 km followed by one 250 km race—as the reason for the change. The top ten shootout was also re-introduced for qualifying for the Saturday race.
 The Phillip Island 500 consisted of two races of 250 km.
 The Auckland SuperSprint adopted a new format, with its four 100 km races being replaced with two races of 200 km, both including mandatory pit stops.

Rule changes

Technical regulations
The 2017 season saw the introduction of Gen 2 Supercar regulations. Two-door coupé body styles are permitted alongside four-door sedans, while the engine regulations were opened up to include turbocharged four or six-cylinder engines. However, cars are still be required to be based on front-engined, rear wheel drive, four-seater production cars that are sold in Australia. The chassis and control components carried over from the New Generation V8 Supercar regulations used since 2013. However all teams are continuing to use New Generation specification cars until the beginning of 2018 when the Holden Commodore ZB built to the new specifications will debut.

Two new control Dunlop tyres were introduced, marking the first change in tyre construction since 2003. Whereas in previous seasons, the two compounds were designated hard and soft, in 2017 these are named soft and super soft respectively. All teams attended a test session on 21 February 2017 at Sydney Motorsport Park to evaluate the new tyre.

Sporting regulations
 Starting in 2017, drivers must earn a racing licence sanctioned by the Confederation of Australian Motorsport (CAMS) in order to be eligible to compete in the category. The licence system was restructured similarly to the Superlicence used in Formula One, with drivers earning points towards their licence by placing in feeder series accredited by CAMS.  This system drew controversy almost immediately because it is based on CAMS series.  Some international drivers needed special exemptions to participate, most notably Matthew Brabham, for whom most of his career was sanctioned by ACCUS member sanctioning bodies, and not CAMS.
 Teams from Supercars' support category, the Dunlop Super2 Series are allowed to compete as wildcards in the main series in five events of the 2017 season, at Barbagallo, Winton, Hidden Valley, Ipswich and Bathurst. The 250-kilometre race held specifically for the Super2 Series at Bathurst will also become a non-championship round, to encourage more applicants.
 The redress rules—outlining the expectations of drivers following on-track contact—were changed for 2017. Drivers deemed responsible for contact are no longer required to return a position to the driver or drivers they hit, but redress instead is voluntary, with drivers who voluntarily return a position being given more favourable treatment than drivers who do not when the incident is reviewed by race officials. The change was introduced following a controversial incident at the 2016 Bathurst 1000 in which Jamie Whincup tried to redress a position to Scott McLaughlin as required by the rules without losing another position to Garth Tander; the subsequent collision saw McLaughlin and Tander collide with Tander retiring from the race.

Results and standings

Season summary

Points system
Points were awarded for each race at an event, to the driver or drivers of a car that completed at least 75% of the race distance and was running at the completion of the race, up to a maximum of 300 points per event.

Standard format: Used for all SuperSprint and SuperStreet races and for both races of the Gold Coast 600.
Endurance format: Used for the Sandown 500 and Bathurst 1000.

Drivers' Championship

Pirtek Enduro Cup

Teams' Championship

Notes:
‡ — Denotes a single-car team.

Manufacturers Championship 
The Manufacturers Championship was won by Ford.

Footnotes

References

External links

Supercars Championship seasons